Tafazzoli or Tafazoli (Persian: تفضلی) is a Persian origin surname which means "charismatic". Persons with the surname include:

 Ahmad Tafazzoli (1937–1997), Iranian scholar and philologist
 Jahangir Tafazzoli (1914–1990), Iranian journalist and politician
 Mohammad Reza Tafazzoli (born 1974), Iranian composer
 Ryan Tafazolli (born 1991), English footballer of Iranian descent

References

Persian-language surnames